Matthew Edward Barkell Clarke (born 22 September 1996) is an English professional footballer who plays as a central defender for Championship club Middlesbrough.

Club career

Ipswich Town
Born in Barham, Suffolk, Clarke joined Ipswich Town academy as an U7 and signed a scholarship with the club in the summer of 2013. He was included in the main squad for the pre-season in the following year.

Clarke made his professional debut for the club on 12 August 2014, starting as a left back in a 1–0 Football League Cup away loss against Crawley Town. On 11 September he signed a two-year professional deal with the club.

Portsmouth
In July 2015, Clarke went on a trial at Portsmouth, signing a six-month loan deal with the club on 3 August.

On 2 September 2015, Clarke signed a new two-year contract at Ipswich Town, contracting him to the club until June 2017. His loan deal at Portsmouth was subsequently extended until the end of the season in January 2016.

Clarke signed a permanent three-year deal with Pompey on 1 July 2016, after a swap with Ipswich for Adam Webster was agreed. Despite suffering an injury at the end of the 2015–16 campaign which ruled him out of the opening weeks of the new campaign, he established himself as one of Portsmouth's most reliable performers as they won the 2016–17 League Two title. His partnership with Christian Burgess ensured that Portsmouth conceded the fewest league goals over the course of the season, letting in just 40 goals in 46 matches.

On 14 February 2018, after remaining a regular starter, Clarke extended his contract until 2020.

Clarke was in the winning squad for Portsmouth in the EFL Trophy Final on 31 March 2019.

Brighton & Hove Albion
On 21 June 2019, Clarke's departure from Portsmouth was announced, with the centre-back signing a four-year deal at Brighton & Hove Albion for an undisclosed fee.

Derby County (loans)
On 2 August 2019, Clarke joined Derby County on a season-long loan. Three days later, Clarke made his debut for Derby in their opening game of the season in a 2–1 away win against Huddersfield. He scored his first goal for the club in a 1–0 win against Hull City on 18 January 2020. He made 37 appearances for Derby during the 2019–20 season, with his performances earning him the Derby County Player of the Year award.

On 26 August, it was revealed that Clarke would return to Derby on a further season-long loan deal for the 2020–21 season. He made 42 appearances in his second season including in the last game as The Rams safety was taken to the wire, ensuring their Championship status after a 3–3 home draw to Sheffield Wednesday on the final day of the season. Rotherham's draw with Cardiff City meant Derby were safe with Rotherham and Sheffield Wednesday relegated.

West Bromwich Albion (loan)

On 13 July 2021, Clarke signed for West Bromwich Albion on loan for the 2021–22 season. He made his debut on 14 August, starting and playing 84 minutes of the 3–2 home victory over Luton Town. He helped keep a clean sheet four days later, playing the whole match of the 4–0 victory against Sheffield United at The Hawthorns. He was named as the club's Player of the Season for 2021–22, his fourth successive such award across three clubs. On 7 May, on Clarke's final appearance on loan at West Brom he scored his first and only goal for the club with a composed finish slipping the ball under Barnsley goalkeeper Jack Walton, in the 4–0 home victory with The Baggies ending the campaign in 10th place.

Middlesbrough 
On 25 August 2022, Clarke joined Championship club Middlesbrough for an undisclosed fee.

Career statistics

Honours
Portsmouth
EFL League Two: 2016–17
EFL Trophy: 2018–19

Individual

Portsmouth Player's Player of the Season: 2017–18
Portsmouth Player of the Season: 2017–18, 2018–19
2018–19 EFL Trophy Final Man of The Match: 2019
PFA Team of the Year: 2018–19 League One
Derby County Player of the Year: 2019–20
West Bromwich Albion Player of the Year: 2021–22

References

External links

1996 births
Living people
People from Barham, Suffolk
English footballers
Association football defenders
Ipswich Town F.C. players
Portsmouth F.C. players
Brighton & Hove Albion F.C. players
Derby County F.C. players
West Bromwich Albion F.C. players
English Football League players
Middlesbrough F.C. players